Lipin may refer to the following places in Poland:

 Lipin, Lower Silesian Voivodeship (south-west Poland)
 Lipin, West Pomeranian Voivodeship (north-west Poland)
 Lipin the former German name of Lipiny, Chodzież County, Greater Poland Voivodeship, Poland

Lipin may also refer to a type of Phosphatidate phosphatase.

See also
Lipin (surname)